"I Will Steal You Back" is the lead single from Jimmy Eat World's eighth studio album Damage. It was released on April 16, 2013, and impacted radio the same day.

Chart performance
"I Will Steal You Back" debuted at #37 on the Billboard Alternative Songs Chart.

References

External links 
 

Jimmy Eat World songs
2013 songs
2013 singles
RCA Records singles